The U.S. Chess Championship is an invitational tournament held to determine the United States chess champion. Begun as a challenge match in 1845, the U.S. Championship has been decided by tournament play for most of its long history. Since 1936, it has been held under the auspices of the U.S. Chess Federation. Until 1999, the event consisted of a round-robin tournament of varying size. From 1999 to 2006, the Championship was sponsored and organized by the Seattle Chess Foundation (later renamed America's Foundation for Chess [AF4C]) as a large Swiss system tournament. AF4C withdrew its sponsorship in 2007. The 2007 and 2008 events were held (again under the Swiss system) in Stillwater, Oklahoma, under the direction of Frank K. Berry. The Saint Louis Chess Club in St. Louis has hosted the annual event since 2009.

As of the 2022 US Chess Championship, twelve players are invited to the event; the reigning champion, the US Open Champion, the US Junior Champion, the US Senior Open Champion, a certain number of players with the highest Invitational Rating, and wildcards chosen by the organizer.

The U.S. Chess championship is the oldest national chess tournament.

Fabiano Caruana is the current champion.

Champions by acclamation 1845–1891
{| class="sortable wikitable"
!  Years !! Champion !! Notes
|-
| 1845–1857 || Charles Stanley || Defeated Eugène Rousseau in a match in 1845
|-
| 1857–1871 || Paul Morphy || Won the first American Chess Congress in 1857
|-
| 1871–1891 || George Henry Mackenzie ||  Won the 2nd, 3rd and 5th American Chess Congress
|}

Match champions 1891–1935
George Henry Mackenzie died in April 1891 and, later that year, Max Judd proposed he, Jackson Showalter and S. Lipschütz contest a triangular match for the championship. Lipschütz withdrew so Judd and Showalter played a match which the latter won. A claim by Walter Penn Shipley that S. Lipschütz became US Champion as a result of being the top-scoring American at the Sixth American Chess Congress, New York 1889, is refuted in a biography of Lipschütz.
The following US Champions until 1909 were decided by matches.

{|class="sortable wikitable"
! !! Year !! Winner !! Loser !! Result !! Notes
|-
| 1 || 1891–92 ||  ||  || +7−4=3 || The final game was delayed until January 1892 because Judd was ill.
|-
| 2 || 1892 ||  ||  || +7−1=7 ||
|-
| 3 || 1894 ||  (2) ||  || +7−6=4 || Prior to the last game the players agreed to extend the match. Many sources classify this as the first of two matches instead of one extended match.
|-
| 4 || 1894 ||  ||  || +5−3=1 || Can be considered a match extension or a new match.
|-
| 5 || 1895 ||  (3) ||  || +7−4=3 ||
|-
| 6 || 1896 ||  (4) ||  || +7−4=4 ||
|-
| 7 || 1896 ||  (5) ||  || +7−2=4 ||
|-
| 8 || 1897 ||  ||  || +10−7=3 || Pillsbury added to the conditions of the match : "... even if I should win, I shall leave Showalter the possession of his championship title".
|-
| 9 || 1898 ||  (2) ||  || +7−2=2 || Contrary to the 1897 match, the title of U.S. champion was clearly at stake in 1898.
|-
| 10 || 1909 ||  ||  || +7−2=3 || Title reverted to Showalter after Pillsbury's death in 1906.
|-
| 11 || 1923 ||  (2) ||  || +5−4=9 || Marshall declined to play in the invitational tournament that began in 1936.
|}

Tournament champions since 1936
{| class="sortable wikitable"
! # !!  Year !! Winner !! Notes
|-
|	1	||	1936	||	 ||
|-
|	2	||	1938	||	 (2) ||
|-
|	3	||	1940	||	 (3) ||
|-
|	- 	||	1941	||	 (4) || Match victory over I.A. Horowitz
|-
|	4	||	1942	||	 (5) || An erroneous ruling by the director allowed Reshevsky to tie for first with Isaac Kashdan. Reshevsky won a playoff match against Kashdan 6 months later.
|-
|	5	||	1944	||	 ||
|-
|	- 	||	1946	||	 (2) || Match victory over Herman Steiner
|-
|	6	||	1946	||	 (6) ||
|-
|	7	||	1948	||	 ||
|-
|	8	||	1951	||	 ||
|-
|	- 	||	1952	||	 (2) || Match victory over Herman Steiner
|-
|	9	||	1954	||	 ||
|-
|	- 	||	1957	||	 (7) || Match victory over Arthur Bisguier. The title of U.S. champion was not at stake. (Bisguier remains champion).
|-
|	10	||	1957/8 	||	 || At 14, the youngest champion ever
|-
|	11	||	1958/9 	||	 (2) ||
|-
|	12	||	1959/0	||	 (3) ||
|-
|	13	||	1960/1 	||	 (4) ||
|-
|-
|	14	||	1961/2 	||	 (3) ||
|-
|	15	||	1962/3 	||	 (5) ||
|-
|	16	||	1963/4 	||	 (6) || Fischer went 11–0 in the tournament, the only perfect score in its history
|-
|	17	||	1965/6 	||	 (7) ||
|-
|	18	||	1966/7 	||	 (8) || A record eighth win (out of eight attempts)
|-
|	19	||	1968	||	 (4) ||
|-
|	20	||	1969	||	 (8) ||
|-
|	21	||	1972	||	 || After playoff 9 months later against Samuel Reshevsky and Lubomir Kavalek
|-
|	22	||	1973	||	   ||
|-
|	23	||	1974	||	 ||
|-
|	24	||	1975	||	 (2) ||
|-
|	25	||	1977	||	 (3) ||
|-
|	26	||	1978	||	 (2) ||
|-
|	27	||	1980	||	 (4)	 			 (5) ||
|-
|	28	||	1981	||	 (5)  ||
|-
|	29	||	1983	||	 (6)	 (2)			 ||
|-
|	30	||	1984	||	 ||
|-
|	31	||	1985	||	 (2) ||
|-
|	32	||	1986	||	 (2) ||
|-
|	33	||	1987	||	   ||
|-
|	34	||	1988	||	 ||
|-
|	35	||	1989	||	 (2)    (3) ||
|-
|	36	||	1990	||	 (3) || Knockout tournament
|-
|	37	||	1991	||	 || Knockout tournament
|-
|	38	||	1992	||	 ||
|-
|	39	||	1993	||	   ||
|-
|	40	||	1994	||	 || The only person to have held both the US and Soviet championships
|-
|	41	||	1995	||	 (2) (2)  ||
|-
|	42	||	1996	||	 (2) ||
|-
|	43	||	1997	||	 (2) ||
|-
|	44	||	1998	||	 (3) ||
|-
|	45	||	1999	||	 (2) ||
|-
|	46	||	2000	||	 (3)  (2)  (4) ||
|-
|	47	||	2002	||	 (3) ||
|-
|	48	||	2003	||	(3) ||
|-
|	49	||	2005	||	 || Tournament was played in 2004, but called the 2005 Championship, for legal reasons
|-
|	50	||	2006	||	 ||
|-
|	51	||	2007	||	 (4) ||
|-
|	52	||	2008	||	 ||
|-
|	53	||	2009	||	 (2) ||
|-
|	54	||	2010	||	 (2) || Kamsky won an Armageddon tie-break playoff against Yury Shulman
|-
|       55      ||      2011    ||       (3) ||
|-
|       56      ||      2012    ||       (3) ||
|-
|       57      ||      2013    ||       (4) || Kamsky won an Armageddon tie-break playoff against Alejandro Ramírez
|-
|	58	||	2014	||	 (5) || Kamsky won a playoff rapid against Varuzhan Akobian after Akobian qualified by beating  on an Armageddon tie-break 
|-
|	59	||	2015	||	 (4) ||
|-
|	60	||	2016	||  ||
|-
|	61	||	2017	||  || Wesley So won a rapid playoff against Alexander Onischuk
|-
|	62	||	2018	||       ||
|-
|	63	||	2019	||  (5) ||
|-
|	64	||	2020	||  (2) || Tournament held online at Lichess due to the COVID-19 pandemic.
|-
|	65	||	2021	||  (3) || So won a rapid playoff against Fabiano Caruana and Samuel Sevian
|-
|   66  ||  2022    ||  (2) ||
|}

Wins per player

See also
U.S. Women's Chess Championship
U.S. Open Chess Championship
U.S. Women's Open Chess Championship
American Chess Congress

Notes

References

External links
Official US Chess Championship Site
St. Louis Chess Club, St. Louis, Missouri

Chess national championships
Championship